Dipeptidyl aminopeptidase-like protein 6 is a protein that in humans is encoded by the DPP6 gene.

This gene encodes a single-pass type II membrane protein that is a member of the S9B family in clan SC of the serine proteases. This protein has no detectable protease activity, most likely due to the absence of the conserved serine residue normally present in the catalytic domain of serine proteases. However, it does bind specific voltage-gated potassium channels and alters their expression and biophysical properties. Alternate transcriptional splice variants, encoding different isoforms, have been characterized.

References

Further reading